The Faber Grand Prix is a defunct WTA Tour affiliated women's tennis tournament played from 1992 to 2000. It was held in Essen in Germany from 1992 to 1994 as well as in 1996, and subsequently in Hanover in Germany from 1997 to 2000. The tournament was played on indoor carpet courts.

Results

Singles

(E)=Essen, (H)=Hanover

Doubles

References
 WTA Results Archive

 
Carpet court tennis tournaments
Indoor tennis tournaments
Defunct tennis tournaments in Germany
WTA Tour
Recurring sporting events established in 1992
Recurring sporting events disestablished in 2000